Middle Ring Road may refer to:

Roads

China
Middle Ring Road (Shanghai)
Middle Ring Road (Tianjin)

United Kingdom
A4540 road, Birmingham, England - also known as the Middle Ring Road

Malaysia
Kuala Lumpur Middle Ring Road 1, Kuala Lumpur
Kuala Lumpur Middle Ring Road 2, Kuala Lumpur